Sreejaya Nair is an Indian actress and dancer. She worked in the Malayalam film industry throughout 1990s and retired after marriage and returned to acting in 2014. She is a professional dancer and conducts a dance school named Sreejaya's School of Classical Dance in Bangalore.

Early life
Sreejaya hails from Kothamangalam, Kerala, India. She began learning dance from the age of five under the teachers Kalamandalam Sumathi and Kalamandalam Saraswathi. She joined Kerala Kalamandalam and took classes in Bharatanatyam, Mohiniyattam and Kuchipudi. She later began training under the teacher Chitra Chandrasekhar Dasarathy.

Career
She made her film debut in the Malayalam drama film Kamaladalam in 1992. In 1998, she acted in comedy drama Summer in Bethlehem. She took a break after her marriage.

Personal life
Sreejaya is married to businessman Madhan Nair and the couple has a daughter named Mythili. They moved to Kozhikode and then to Bangalore and Canada after marriage. Later returned to and settled in Bangalore. Sreejaya conducts a dance school named Sreejaya's School of Classical Dance in Bangalore, which has five branches in the city and trains more than 500 students.

Filmography

Films

Television

References

External links
 
 

Actresses from Bangalore
Actresses from Kerala
Actresses in Malayalam cinema
21st-century Indian actresses
Bharatanatyam exponents
21st-century Indian dancers
Indian female classical dancers
Dancers from Kerala
Indian dance teachers
Teachers of Indian classical dance
Performers of Indian classical dance
Year of birth missing (living people)
Living people
Actresses in Malayalam television